Petroc  may refer to:

 Petroc (college), a college in Devon, England
 Saint Petroc, 6th century Celtic Christian saint
 Petroc Baladrddellt, 7th century Dumnonian king
 Petroc Trelawny, 21st century Cornish broadcaster